Roy Hoopes (1922-2009) was an American journalist, writer, and biographer who wrote the official biographies of James M. Cain and Ralph Ingersoll.

Roy Hoopes was born on May 17, 1922 in Salt Lake City, Utah to Roy and Lydia Hoopes. After active duty in WWII in the Naval Reserves, he attended George Washington University in Washington, D.C., completing his A.B. in 1943 and M.A. in 1948. He worked as a writer and editor for various magazines in DC, including The Washingtonian,  Path-finder, High Fidelity, Democratic Digest Playboy, and National Geographic. From 1957-1977 he also had a weekly newspaper column for the Berkshire Eagle under the false name Peter Potomac. He was a member of the Oral History Association and the National Press Club.

Hoopes wrote and co-wrote over 30 works of fiction and non-fiction. His most notable works include his biographies of James M. Cain, for which he won the Edgar Award in 1984, and Ralph Ingersoll, he also wrote novels and nonfiction about the Peace Corps, the steel industry, politics, sports, and Hollywood.

Roy Hoopes died of pneumonia on December 8, 2009 at age 87.

Selected published works 

 Cain: The Biography of James M. Cain (1982) ISBN
 Ralph Ingersoll: A Biography (1985) ISBN
 The Steel Crisis: 72 Hours That Shook the Nation (1963) 
 Political Campaigning (1979) ISBN 
 The Peace Corps Experience (1968) 
 The Presidency: A Question of Power (with Erwin C. Hargrove)
 A Report on Fallout in Your Food (1962) 
 Everything You Need to Know about Building the Custom Home: How to Be Your Own General Contractor (with John Folds) (1990) ISBN
 A Watergate Tape (2001) ISBN
 When the Stars Went to War: Hollywood and WWII (1994) ISBN
 Paralegal Careers (with William Fry)
 The Making of a Mormon Apostle: The Story of Rudger Clawson (1990) ISBN
 Our Man in Washington (2000) ISBN
 Americans Remember the Homefront (2002) ISBN

Selected edited works 

 Career in C Major and Other Fiction (1986) ISBN
 The Baby in the Icebox and Other Short Fiction (1981) ISBN
 The Life and Hard Times of the Late, Great Peter Potomac
 Wit from Overseas (1953)

References 

Journalists from Utah
Writers from Salt Lake City
20th-century American biographers
George Washington University alumni
The Washington Post journalists
Playboy people
National Geographic people
Edgar Award winners
1922 births
2009 deaths
Deaths from pneumonia in Maryland
20th-century American journalists
American male journalists